European Union has several member states that have a significant number of islands.

 List of islands of Bulgaria
 List of islands of Cyprus
 List of islands of Denmark
 List of islands of Estonia
 List of islands of Finland
 List of islands of France
 List of islands of Germany
 List of islands of Greece
 List of islands of Hungary
 List of islands of Italy
 List of islands of Latvia
 List of islands of Lithuania
 List of islands of Malta
 List of islands of the Netherlands
 List of islands of Poland
 List of islands of Portugal
 List of islands of Romania
 List of islands of Slovakia
 List of islands of Slovenia
 List of islands of Spain
 List of islands of Sweden

European Union-related lists